Christopher Charles Benninger (born 1942, America) permanently migrated to India in 1971. He studied architecture at the University of Florida, doing his post-graduate education in urban planning at the Massachusetts Institute of Technology, and post-graduation in architecture at Harvard University, where he later taught. His design thesis at Harvard (1967) explored his original idea of Site and Services Shelter Systems, which he transformed into an on the ground project for the World Bank and the Madras Urban Development Authority in 1973. Travels to South America in his youth, observing struggling communities and indigenous cultures, had an ever-lasting impact on his life's work. All of his post graduate studies focused on more inclusive, accessible, sustainable urban and regional systems, leading him to a Fulbright Fellowship to India (1968–1969) where he studied shelter systems, leading to his highly quoted article in the Ekistics Journal, "Models of Habitat Mobility in Transitional Economies".

The purpose of Benninger’s studies, institution building, writing, professional practice, international advisory work and lectures have all focused training sensitive future leaders, and on creating a more humane society, reducing poverty and inequality, while enhancing accessibility and sustainability. 

Leaving aside his professor’s post at Harvard in 1971 he returned to Ahmedabad as a Ford Foundation Advisor to the Centre for Environmental Planning and Technology, invited by B.V. Doshi, to jointly found the Faculty of Planning, at CEPT University, where Benninger presently sits on the Board of Management  

Breaking all norms of physical planning education, Benninger’s curriculum at CEPT integrated socio-economic and spatial systems planning, with the intention of creating more rounded and capable professionals, who would lead India into the future with a sound understanding of India’s development challenges and the role of systems planning to improve the lives of common people. This was the first urban planning course in the subcontinent to teach social science research techniques, computer analysis, practice field-based research, hold seminars on poverty and inequality, and study the environmental impacts of planning projects.  

In this vein he founded the Center for Development Studies and Activities (1976) with Aneeta Gokhale Benninger that amplified his earlier work, training graduates how to learn from people, through participatory planning, field work, information systems analysis, seminars on poverty, inequality and sustainability. 

Benninger has advised multiple international organizations within the United Nations system, including the World Bank and Asian Development Bank, leading to more just and equitable investment and development policies, programs, and projects.  He has advised the governments of Sri Lanka, Bhutan, Nepal, Malaysia, Indonesia, and states across India on the preparation of their regional and urban development plans, emphasizing “user end access,” to health, safety, security, skill development and employment, with minimal acceptable comfort levels. 

He is a well-known writer in the field of architecture and urbanism, with a title, Letters to a Young Architect, appearing on the Top Ten Best Selling Books of India list. His well know theory The Principles of Intelligent Urbanism, appears in this book.

Benninger’s architectural studios, CCBA Designs Pvt. Ltd., at India House, in Pune, India was founded with his partner Ramprasad Akkisetti Naidu, emerging over the past decades as an international leader in appropriate sustainable design. Designs for India, Bhutan, China and Burundi indicate the firm’s active role in making the world a better place to live in. The book, CHRISTOPHER BENNINGER: Architecture for Modern India, published by SKIRA, in Milan, Italy, jointly with Rizzoli in America illustrates the firm’s architectural and urban planning work.

Early Life and Education
Dr. Lawrence Joseph Benninger (Christopher's father), hailed from a working-class Czechoslovakian immigrant family. He was a professor of economics, specializing in accounting systems, publishing articles and books, and was popular on the lecture circuit in his field. He advised the governments in Central and South America on economic development, helping to found a college for young professional managers in Medellin, Colombia. 

Growing up under the influence of a “thinker-doer,” exposed Benninger to debates over capitalism versus socialism, balanced versus skewed development, and public policies for equality. Visits to his parents in Medellin, Colombia introduced him first hand to abject poverty, exploitation of immigrant populations, and the imposition of western cultural norms over ancient indigenous civilizations. As a youngster, walking amongst the barrios (slums) on the mountain slopes of South America, and adventuring deep into the rural jungles of the Andes, left an imprint in his mind of the ground realities of major global issues of development in a rapidly changing world. 

In contrast, Benninger’s mother, Ernestine Minerva Eberlein, hailed from a French aristocratic family focused on a western urbane lifestyle of music, art, drama and architecture. His mother’s sister Roxane Eberlein was close to Benninger’s “uncle,” Adlai Stevenson, who was twice the Democratic nominee for the office of United States President, and was the American Ambassador to the United Nations under Kennedy. Spending impressionable days, living in the U. S. Embassy in New York, attending United Nations Security Council Meetings as an observer, and meeting other guests at the Embassy, opened up an entirely new world to Benninger’s young mind. Stevenson’s close circle of associates brought him close to personalities like Sir Robert Jackson, Chairman of the United Nations Relief Organization, and an advisor to India and Bangladesh. Sir Robert Jackson gifted Benninger a lifetime subscription of the development journal Ekistics, introducing him to an international association of people committed to an ethical world community, with a common code of development. Barbara Ward, author of India and the West, Five Ideas that Changed the World and Only One Earth, became Professor Benninger’s lifelong mentor, inviting him to the Delos Symposium in Greece (1967), where he reached by cycling 1,500 kilometers from Paris to Athens. This adventure introduced him to struggling rural peasants, and less developed areas of the European countryside, including cycling through Communist Yugoslavia, giving him a balanced view of life under Communism. At the Delos Symposium, held on-board Doxiadis’ boat in the Aegean Sea, included world thought leaders like Buckminster Fuller, Arnold J. Toynbee, Barbara Ward, Jaqueline Tyrwhitt, and Constantinos Apostolou Doxiadis presented their theories and practice of development, reviewing Barbara Ward’s plan for the first Habitat Forum at Vancouver, Doxiadis’ plan for Islamabad and Jaqueline Tyrwhitt’s strategies for sheltering the poor in India as a UN human settlements advisor, setting up India’s department of housing. 

These childhood and youthful influences had a powerful impact on Benninger’s life. At the University of Florida, he was a student founder of Freedom Party, standing for integrating the university, stopping racial segregation, opening more admissions for women, ending compulsory military training on campus, and other social goals. Under Martin Luther King’s leadership, he and his sister, Judith Benninger Brown, actively supported the Congress for Racial Equality, entering segregated cinema halls and restaurants with their coloured friends forcing the owners to allow access of coloured into their establishments.

Leaving Florida for Cambridge, Massachusetts, Benninger entered Harvard’s Graduate School of Design as one of 12 students studying under Josep Lluis Sert, Joseph Zaleski, and Jerzy Soltan, all Le Corbusier collaborators. There he studied art under Mirko Basaldella, the Italian sculptor. Life in Cambridge allowed Benninger to “walk on two legs,” following his mother’s love of high art, while pursuing his father’s socio-economic development interests. He studied development economics under John Kenneth Galbraith, past Ambassador to India and author of The New Industrial State. He continued his post graduate studies at the Massachusetts Institute of Technology, under Horacio Caminos, working on the book Urban Dwelling Environments. Famous theorists taught from their writings like Kevin Lynch from the image of the city; Hebert Gans from The Urban Villagers, and John F. C. Turner taught how from his book The People Build with Their Own Hands. All of these teachers, their ideas and methods gifted Benninger a treasure house of foundation ideas and concepts that guided him through his entire life. Through directed readings, new knowledge systems, advanced analytical techniques, research methods and thoughtful planning and design procedures at MIT, he learned concepts which he carried on with him to India, applying them in his teaching, institution building, writing, practice as an architect and leading urban planner, and expressing them through his many lectures and writing.

Personal Life  
Benninger is married to Aneeta Gokhale Benninger, an eminent environmentalist, and has one son Lawrence Siddhartha Benninger, a development planner who has developed new digital planning analysis and management tools.

Career 
Benninger studied under Josep Lluis Sert and worked in his studio. On the invitation of B. V. Doshi, in 1971 he resigned from his tenured post at Harvard and shifted to Ahmedabad, India as a Ford Foundation Advisor to the Ahmedabad Educational Society, where he founded the School of Planning. In 1976 he shifted to Pune, India, where he founded the Center for Development Studies and Activities. In 1983 Benninger wrote the Theme Paper for the United Nations Commission on Human Settlements 1984. In 1986 he was engaged by the Asian Development Bank to author their position paper on Urban Development, arguing successfully the case for extending financial assistance to the urban development sector. Benninger is on the Board of Editors of CITIES journal (UK).

Architectural works
Benninger's designs include the Center for Development Studies and Activities, the Mahindra United World College of India, the Samundra Institute of Maritime Studies, the YMCA International Camp, Nilshi, India, the Kirloskar Institute of Advanced Management Studies and the International School Aamby. The Centre for Life Sciences Health and Medicine in Pune is a radical departure from his earlier work.

The Mahindra United World College of India won international recognition as the recipient of the Business Week/Architectural Record Award for Excellence in 2000. This award was sponsored jointly with the American Institute of Architects. Business Week called the Mahindra United World College of India one of the ten super structures of the world in 2000. The project also won the Designer of the Year Award  in 1999.

Benninger's work in urban design, city management and town planning resulted in his principles of intelligent urbanism, which guided his planning of the new capital of Bhutan.

Chapters in Books by Christopher Benninger
Urban Dwelling Environments, Editor, H. Caminos, John F. C. Turner, et. al., MIT Press [Authored chapters on "El Ermitano," Lima, Peru and the "North End" of Boston], 1969.
Mishra, R. P. Editor:  Benninger, C. "Rules and Regulations," Settlement in South-East Asia, United Nations Publication, Institute of Development Studies, Mysore University, 1976.
"Situations and Settings," International Year Book of Child Psychiatry, 1978.
Habitat Asia, Ed., R. P. Mishra et. al., "Ahmedabad, A Variety of Urban Forms," 1979.
Readings in Decentralized Planning, Vol. I, Edited by B.N. Yugandhar and Amitava Mukherjee, "District Planning Methods and Techniques: An Overview," 	Christopher C. Benninger, pages 367-430, Concept Publishing, New Delhi, 1991.
Regional Planning and Development, Edited by K.V. Sundaram, "New Institutional Systems for Enhanced Regional Planning and Management," 	Christopher C. Benninger, pages 137-166, Heritage Publishers, New Delhi, 1990.
Conflict Resolution Through Non-Violence, Edited by K.D. Gangrade and R.P. Mishra, "Development, Resources and Conflict," Christopher C. Benninger, pages 193-230, Concept Publishing, New Delhi, 1990.
"Poona: A Modern Metropolis," in The Million Cities, edited by R.P. Mishra, 1994.
Politics of Modern Maharashtra, “Participatory Governance,” Pune University Press with S. P. College, August 2000, Pune, India.
Indian Medium Towns, Edited by Jaymala Diddee, “Towns in the Development Scenario,” pages 48-54, 1997. 
Economic Development Alternatives, “Participatory Governance: Some Issues,” pages 171-206, Institute of Social Sciences, 1997, New Delhi.
Timeless Inspirator, Edited by Raghunath Anant Mashelkar, “Architecture as a Social tools,” pages 114-123, 2010.
Urban Design Practice: An International Review, Edited by Sebastian Loew, “India,” pages 218-236, Royal Institute of British Architects, London, 2012.
The Urban Fringe of Indian Cities, Edited by Jutta K. Dikshit, pages 64-67, “Conundrums, Visions and Devices of Urban Form,” New Delhi, 2011.
Livable Cities from a Global Perspective, Edited by Robert Caves and Fritz Wagner, “Pune Metropolis: Unlivable Cities within a Livable Metropolis,” pages 93-107, Routledge, 2018, New York.

Awards and recognition
Benninger is the sixth winner in India of the Golden Architect Award for Lifetime Achievement (2006), conferred in May 2007 by the A+D and Spectrum Foundation. Six Indian architects had previously been honored with the Great Master's Award. Over several years he was recognized as one of the top ten architects in India by Construction World Magazine. He was conferred with the Singapore Lifetime Achievement Award by the Singapore-based Business Excellence & Research Group (BERG) in 2015.

Awards 
 2000 | Top 10 Best Buildings of the World | The Business Week Architectural Record Awards of American Institute of Architects, USA for Mahindra United World College of India.
 2001 | The Aga Khan Award for Architecture for Mahindra United World College of India as the top 20 best projects of the world.
2002 | The World Architecture Awards, Berlin for Mahindra United World College of India as a finalist. 
2006 | Recognition for Excellence in Design, U.K. - Lifetime achievement award. 
2006 | Golden Architect Award for Lifetime Achievement by A+D and Spectrum Foundation 
2010 | World Architecture Community, U.K. - Citation for Nabha House, Haryana Cultural Centre, New Delhi, India. 
2011 | Holcim Sustainability Awards, Switzerland for Lifecare Multi-specialty Hospital, Udgir - Certificate of Appreciation.

Publications 
 Letters to a Young Architect | 2009 

Letters to a Young Architects is a sensitive memoir of Christopher Benninger's life in India and his personal concerns about Architectural Theory and contemporary urban issues.

 Architecture for Modern India | 2015 

This is a book about the practice of Architecture in South Asia and the kinds of artifacts  CCBA Designs has produced over the past many years.

See also
Ekistics
Suzlon One Earth

References

External links

1942 births
Living people
American urban planners
Harvard Graduate School of Design alumni
MIT School of Architecture and Planning alumni
Harvard Graduate School of Design faculty
Architects from Ohio
20th-century American male artists
21st-century American male artists
20th-century American architects
People from Gainesville, Florida
New Urbanism
American emigrants to India
People from Butler County, Ohio